Gennady Emelyanov (Russian: Геннадий Егорович Емельянов; born 01 January 1957) is a Russian politician serving as a senator from the State Council of the Republic of Tatarstan since 2 October 2019. 

Gennady Emelyanov is under personal sanctions introduced by the European Union, the United Kingdom, the USA, Canada, Switzerland, Australia, Ukraine, New Zealand, for ratifying the decisions of the "Treaty of Friendship, Cooperation and Mutual Assistance between the Russian Federation and the Donetsk People's Republic and between the Russian Federation and the Luhansk People's Republic" and providing political and economic support for Russia's annexation of Ukrainian territories.

Biography

Gennady Emelyanov was born on 1 January 1957 in Tatar Autonomous Soviet Socialist Republic. In 1987, he graduated from the Kazan National Research Technological University. 

From 1974 to 1987, Emelyanov worked at Nizhnekamsk motor transport enterprises. From 1999 to 2004, he was the First Deputy Head of Administration of Naberezhnye Chelny. The same year he was appointed as head of the Zelenodolsk administration. On 17 March 2009, he was appointed as Minister of Transport and Road Facilities of the Republic of Tatarstan. From 2010 to 2019, he was also the deputy of the Yelabuzhsk City Council of the 2nd and 3rd convocations and, simultaneously, the mayour of Yelabuzhsk. On 2 October 2019, he became the senator from the State Council of the Republic of Tatarstan.

References

Living people
1957 births
United Russia politicians
21st-century Russian politicians
Members of the Federation Council of Russia (after 2000)